Hawke's Bay (often known as the Hawke's Bay Magpies) are a New Zealand professional rugby union team based in Napier, New Zealand. The union was originally established in 1884, with the National Provincial Championship established in 1976. They now play in the reformed National Provincial Championship competition. They play their home games at McLean Park in Napier in the Hawke's Bay region. The team is affiliated with the Hurricanes Super Rugby franchise. Their home playing colours are black and white.

Current squad

The Hawke's Bay Magpies squad for the 2022 Bunnings NPC is:

Honours

Hawke's Bay have never been overall Champions. Their full list of honours, though, include:

National Provincial Championship Second Division North Island
Winners: 1979

National Provincial Championship Second Division
Winners: 1988, 1990, 2001, 2002, 2003, 2005

ITM Cup Championship Division
Winners: 2011, 2015

Mitre 10 Cup Championship Division
Winners: 2020

Current Super Rugby players
Players named in the 2022 Hawke's Bay Magpies squad, who also earned contracts or were named in a squad for any side participating in the 2023 Super Rugby Pacific season.

References

External links

National Provincial Championship
New Zealand rugby union teams
Sport in the Hawke's Bay Region